The list of coin hoards in Vietnam comprises significant archaeological hoards of coins, other types of coinages (e.g. sycees) or objects related to coins discovered in Vietnam. The history of Vietnamese currency, independent from China, dates back to the Đinh dynasty period with the Thái Bình Hưng Bảo (太平興寶), produced from 970 to 979. The Vietnamese produced cash coins similar to the ones produced in China and circulated alongside Chinese, Japanese, Korean, and Ryukyuan cash coins brought into the country through international trade. Cash coins continued to be produced in Vietnam until the 1940s under the Nguyễn dynasty. Through international trade foreign currencies such as Spanish dollars and Mexican reals were brought into the country by merchants and these coins would continue to circulate in Vietnam until the French colonial administration outlawed their usage on January 1, 1906, in favour of their own coinage, while Vietnamese cash coins were permitted to continue circulating. Despite the presence of coinages barter persisted until the 20th century. Following its declaration of independence in 1945 the Democratic Republic of Vietnam started issuing its own currency in 1946, while allowing cash coins to circulate until 1948. In 1952 the piastre was abolished and replaced with the South Vietnamese đồng in the south in 1953. Following Vietnamese reunification in 1976 the North Vietnamese đồng and Liberation đồng would continue to circulate in the Socialist Republic of Vietnam until May 2, 1978, when they were replaced by a new national currency.

The coins uncovered in Vietnam includes both native coinages as well as Chinese cash coins in large numbers as Vietnam was a part of China as well as through historical trade with China.

Vietnamese cash coins are also sometimes found in other countries because of trade, such as a Trần dynasty cash coin being unearthed in Hakodate, Japan.

Overview 

In modern Vietnam the supply of undiscovered cash coins is rapidly declining as large amounts of Vietnamese cash coins were excavated during the 1980s and 1990s, in Vietnam the excavation of antiques such as cash coins is an industry in itself and the cash coins are mostly being dug up by farmers. After the Vietnam War ended in 1975 a large number of metal detectors numbering in the many thousands were left behind in the former area of South Vietnam which helped fuel the rise of this industry. The antique bronze industry is mostly concentrated in small rural villages where farmers rent metal detectors to search their own lands for bronze antiques to then either sell as scrap or to dealers, these buyers purchase lumps of cash coins by either kilogramme or ton to then hire skilled people to search through these lumps of cash coins for sellable specimens, these coins are then sold to other dealers in Vietnam, China, and Japan. During the zenith of the coin recovery business in Vietnam the number of bulk coins found on a monthly basis was fifteen tons but only roughly fifteen kilogrammes of those coins were sellable and the rest of the coins would melted down as scrap metal. As better metal detectors that could search deeper more Vietnamese cash coins were discovered but in modern times the supply of previously undiscovered Vietnamese cash coins is quickly diminishing.

In modern times many Vietnamese cash coins are found in sunken shipwrecks which are mandated by Vietnamese law to be the property of the Vietnamese government as salvaged ships of which the owner was unknown belong to the state.

List of coin hoards in Vietnam

See also 

 List of coin hoards in China

Notes

References

Sources 

Archaeology-related lists
Treasure troves of Vietnam
Lists of hoards
Vietnam history-related lists